The Big Noise is a 1936 British musical comedy film directed by Alex Bryce and starring Alastair Sim, Norah Howard and Fred Duprez. The film was a quota quickie made at Wembley Studios by the Hollywood studio Fox's British subsidiary.

Synopsis
A clerk in an oil company is promoted in order to make him the fall guy for a series of illegal transactions that have brought it to the brink of ruin, but instead manages to turn the business around

Cast
 Alastair Sim as Finny 
 Norah Howard as Mary Miller 
 Fred Duprez as Henry Hadley 
 Grizelda Harvey as Consuelo 
 C. Denier Warren as E. Pinkerton Gale 
 Viola Compton as Mrs. Dayton 
 Peter Popp as Jenkins 
 Howard Douglas as Gluckstein 
 Reginald Forsyth as Orchestra Leader 
 Edie Martin as Old Lady

References

Bibliography
 Chibnall, Steve. Quota Quickies: The British of the British 'B' Film. British Film Institute, 2007.
 Low, Rachael. Filmmaking in 1930s Britain. George Allen & Unwin, 1985.
 Wood, Linda. British Films, 1927-1939. British Film Institute, 1986.

External links

1936 films
British musical comedy films
British black-and-white films
1936 musical comedy films
Films directed by Alex Bryce
Films shot at Wembley Studios
1930s English-language films
1930s British films